Guanyin Airport railway station is a railway station in Suining County, Xuzhou, Jiangsu, People's Republic of China. Passengers may reach the airport via a free shuttle bus.

History
The station was called Shuanggou railway station during construction. On 14 October 2019, it was officially named as Guanyin Airport railway station. Guanyin Airport railway station opened on 16 December 2019. The initial service level was twelve trains per day in total.

References

Railway stations in Jiangsu
Railway stations in China opened in 2019
Airport railway stations in China